The phrase merger doctrine or doctrine of merger may refer to one of several legal doctrines:
 Merger doctrine (antitrust law)
 Merger doctrine (civil procedure)
 Merger doctrine (copyright law)
 Merger doctrine (criminal law)
 Merger doctrine (family law)
 Merger doctrine (property law)
 Merger doctrine (trust law)

Legal doctrines and principles